KTXD-LP, UHF analog channel 43, was a low-powered Azteca América-affiliated television station licensed to Amarillo, Texas, United States. The station was owned by Una Vez Mas Holdings.

On September 22, 2009, KTXD-LP ceased operations due to technical difficulties. A silent STA was requested until the licensee can resolve the problems and resume operation. However, the station never resumed operations, and its license was cancelled by the FCC on May 28, 2011.

References

TXD-LP
Television channels and stations disestablished in 2009
Defunct television stations in the United States
Television channels and stations established in 1994
1994 establishments in Texas
2009 disestablishments in Texas
TXD-LP